James Allan Kilby Macdonald (September 6, 1913 – May 11, 1986) was a Canadian professional ice hockey left winger who played four seasons in the National Hockey League for the New York Rangers.

Playing career
MacDonald started his hockey career with the Ottawa Jr. Montagnards of the OCJHL IN 1930-31. In 1934-35, he moved to the GBHL and played with the Kirkland Lake Blue Devils. The next season, MacDonald played with the Noranda Copper Kings and he helped the team make it to the Allan Cup. MacDonald spent the next three years with the New York Rovers in the Eastern Amateur Hockey League and the Philadelphia Ramblers of the International-American Hockey League. He was chosen to the EAHL First All-Star Team in 1936-37 and in 1938-39 MacDonald was selected to the IAHL First All-Star Team.

In 1939-40, MacDonald finally made it to the National Hockey League as he was signed by the New York Rangers. He helped the Rangers win the Stanley Cup that year and was also awarded the Calder Memorial Trophy for best rookie of the year. In 1941-42, MacDonald was sent down to the American Hockey League with the Hershey Bears. He played in 37 before being traded to the Buffalo Bisons.

In 1942-43, MacDonald joined the army. He played hockey while in the army with the Montreal Army. MacDonald returned to the NHL in 1943-44 with the New York Rangers. He would remain with the Rangers until 1944-45. MacDonald went on to play in the Quebec Senior Hockey League in 1945-46 with the Hull Volants. MacDonald would play in 9 games with the team before retiring.

Awards and achievements
Selected to the EAHL First All-Star Team in 1937.
Selected to the IAHL First All-Star Team in 1939.
Stanley Cup champion in 1940.
Calder Memorial Trophy winner in 1940.

Career statistics

External links

1913 births
1986 deaths
Calder Trophy winners
Canadian ice hockey left wingers
Canadian military personnel of World War II
Eastern Hockey League coaches
Ice hockey people from Ottawa
New York Rangers players
New York Rovers players
Stanley Cup champions
Canadian expatriate ice hockey players in the United States
Canadian ice hockey coaches